Matthew Joseph Underhill (born September 16, 1979) is a Canadian retired professional ice hockey goaltender who played in one National Hockey League game with the Chicago Blackhawks during the 2003–04 NHL season. He was inaugurated into the Cornell Athletic Hall of Fame on November 3, 2012.
He taught English at Boston Collegiate Charter School for many years and now he’s a hockey coach in New Hampshire. He is a father of three.

See also
List of players who played only one game in the NHL

Awards and honors

References

External links

1979 births
Alaska Aces (ECHL) players
Calgary Flames draft picks
Canadian ice hockey goaltenders
Chicago Blackhawks players
Cornell Big Red men's ice hockey players
Florence Pride players
Ice hockey people from British Columbia
Living people
Manchester Monarchs (AHL) players
Mississippi Sea Wolves players
Norfolk Admirals players
Pee Dee Pride players
People from Campbell River, British Columbia
Providence Bruins players
St. John's Maple Leafs players
AHCA Division I men's ice hockey All-Americans